General People's Congress may refer to:
General People's Congress (Yemen), the ruling political party in Yemen
General People's Congress (Libya), a former legislative body of the Great Socialist People's Libyan Arab Jamahiriya